Cheolsan Station is a station on the Seoul Subway Line 7. It is one of the three metro stations in the suburban city of Gwangmyeong.

Station layout

Vicinity
Exit 1 : Wangjaesan Park, Cheolsan Market
Exit 2 : Gwangmyeong Police Station, Gwangdeok Elementary School
Exit 3 : Gwangmyeong Middle & High Schools, Gwangmyeong City Hall, Gwangmyeong Court Building
Exit 4 : Gwangseong Elementary School

References

Metro stations in Gwangmyeong
Seoul Metropolitan Subway stations
Railway stations opened in 2000